Rooftop Records was a Christian music record label, founded in 1982 by the Highway Missionary Society, the parent organization of the band Servant, and distributed by Benson Records. The label was formed to gain greater creative control for the band, as well as a vehicle to promote artists they believed in. Due to the financial stress of supporting Servant's "Great American Album Giveaway" tour, Benson dissolved the relationship, bringing an early end to the nascent label.

Artist roster 

 Mac Frampton (pianist, à la Dino)
 Robyn Pope (CCM singer)
 Servant (rock band)
 Shelter (a Michigan-based rock band, not to be confused with Shelter, a New York City band formed by Ray Cappo)
 Loyd Thogmartin (MOR singer)

Discography

References 

American record labels
Christian record labels
Record labels established in 1982
Companies based in Oregon
1982 establishments in the United States